Cienega High School (also known as CHS) is a public high school in Pima County, Arizona. It opened in the fall of 2001 with approximately 400 students (freshmen and sophomores). It is a member of the Arizona Interscholastic Association's 5A Conference.

Cienega is currently the largest school in the Vail Unified School District in terms of student enrollment.

History
Its opening was scheduled for 2001.

Band Programs
Cienega's Instrumental Music Program offers a variety of different ensembles.
 Copper Thunder Marching Band
 Color Guard
 Bobcat PepBand
 Concert Band
 Symphonic Band
 Jazz Band
 Orchestra
 United Sound

Sports Programs

Fall Sports 
Cienega organizes sports during the fall season
 Football
 Spirit Line "cheerleading" (male and female)
 Cross Country
 Volleyball (female)
 Golf (male and female)
 Swimming

Winter Sports 
Cienega organizes some sports during the winter season.
 Basketball (male and female)
 Soccer (male and female)
 Wrestling

Commitment to Graduate Program 
The Commitment to Graduate Program, or C2G, was made to address the increasing rate of high school students dropping out before graduating in the United States.

Notable alumni
Seth Mejias-Brean, MLB, San Diego Padres (Class of 2009)

References

External links
Cienega High School
 David Leighton, "Street Smarts: East-side road named for Realtor/volunteer/activist," (Mary Ann Cleveland Way) Arizona Daily Star, July 29, 2014

Public high schools in Arizona
Schools in Pima County, Arizona
Educational institutions established in 2001
2001 establishments in Arizona